Down Our Street is a 1932 black and white British film directed by Harry Lachman.

Plot
This drama, set during the Depression, sees the character Charlie Stubbs trying to escape his poverty by becoming a criminal. When this course of action fails he cleans up his act and becomes a cab driver for the woman he loves, Annie Collins. Trouble follows Charlie however when Annie's uncle discovers his past.

Cast
Hugh Williams as Charlie Stubbs
Nancy Price as Annie Collins
Elizabeth Allan as Maisie Collins
Binnie Barnes as Tessie Bemstein
Frederick Burtwell as Fred Anning
Sydney Fairbrother as Maggie Anning
Alexander Field as Sam
Morris Harvey as Bill Collins
Merle Tottenham as Rose

External links
 
 

1932 films
British black-and-white films
Films directed by Harry Lachman
Paramount Pictures films
British drama films
1932 drama films
Films shot at Imperial Studios, Elstree
1930s English-language films
1930s British films